In Odia folklore, Dharmapada was the son of a great architect named Bishu Maharana, who completed the construction of the Sun Temple at Konark, Odisha on the eastern coastline of India, in a single night to save 1,200 craftsmen from execution from the then King Langula Narasingha Deva I. Legends say he sacrificed his own life by jumping into the ocean after carrying out the final step to complete the temple top to prevent the story from spreading. The Konark temple is still standing tall since 13th-century telling Bisu Maharana and his Son Dharmapada's stories.

Legend
According to history, the king Langula Narasingha Deva I of the Eastern Ganga Dynasty decided to build a massive temple at Konark. The temple was to be in the shape of the Sun god, Surya riding in his chariot. 1,200 craftsmen were recruited to construct the temple, led by one named Bishu Maharana and the project was to take twelve years.

As the end of the twelve years approached, Dharmapada, the son of Bishu Maharana, now 12 years of age, went to visit his father. Upon arrival, he found his father distressed; the crown on the Sun temple's top had yet to be completed and the king had threatened to execute all 1,200 craftsmen if they did not finish it by morning. Although the task seemed impossible, Dharmapada decided to single-handedly completed it.

A debate then took place among the craftsmen. Fearing for their own lives if it became known that a child had completed the work instead of them, they demanded that Dharmapada be killed, a suggestion his father strenuously resisted. At last, to settle this debate, Dharmapada jumped from the crown he had completed, killing himself and ensuring the safety of the craftsmen.

Historical relevance of the character
There are few references available to support the existence of such a person named Dharmapada. There is not much mention of this name in any of the ancient Odia texts. However, the legend of Dharmapada is widely popular across the state of Odisha. Extensive writing referring to the legend in the poem Dharmapada penned by Utkalamani Gopabandhu Das has probably given the character much-needed identity in modern Odia literature.

Temple
The temple that Dharmapada is said to have completed still stands in Konark today, although in a somewhat dilapidated state. Constructed in the 13th century, it has been pillaged several times since then and has suffered severe damage. It is listed today as a World Heritage Site.

See also
Dhammapada

References

External links
Dharmapada
 http://www.mantraonnet.com/temple-konark.html

History of Odisha